Kiseke is an administrative ward in Ilemela District, Mwanza Region, Tanzania with a postcode number 33216. 

In 2016 the Tanzania National Bureau of Statistics report there were 15,274 people in the ward.

References

Wards of Mwanza Region
Ilemela District
Constituencies of Tanzania